The Amorist is an English-language erotic magazine launched in 2017 in the United Kingdom.

History

Rowan Pelling, after working as a columnist at the Daily Telegraph, a journalist at  Private Eye,  and an editor of the Erotic Review, started The Amorist in April 2017 with a "small staff" of an editorial team of four (herself, a deputy editor, a designer, and a features editor) and a "tight budget." The first issue had seven pages of advertising, including ads for an "upmarket" sex toy company and a matchmaking service,  with an initial print-run of 12,000 and a cover price of £4.95.

Content
The magazine's founder and chief editor had stated she aimed for "a monthly anthology of erotica, news, reviews and fiction, a blend of love, romance and sex." 
Pelling's stated challenge is "to get it on the general interest shelf next to National Geographic."

Online
After about seven months of publication, the magazine switched to an online-only format.

See also
Erotica
Erotic literature

References

External links
Official website

Monthly magazines published in the United Kingdom
Erotica magazines published in the United Kingdom